Ívar Stefánsson (8 October 1927  – 17 July 2009) was an Icelandic cross-country skier who competed in the 1950s. He finished 29th in the  event at the 1952 Winter Olympics in Oslo.

External links
Olympic 50 km cross country skiing results: 1948-64

Ivar Stefansson
Cross-country skiers at the 1952 Winter Olympics
Ivar Stefansson
1927 births
2009 deaths
20th-century Icelandic people